The women's 3000 metres steeplechase event at the 2013 Summer Universiade was held on 10 July. All three original medalists were later disqualified from the competition.

Results

References

Results

3000
2013 in women's athletics
2013